Kenyam is a town and district in Nduga Regency, Highland Papua, Indonesia. It is the capital of the regency. Its population is 8148.

History 
On 31 December 2015, President Joko Widodo, accompanied by First Lady Iriana, visited Kenyam, Nduga Regency, Papua Province, to review the construction of the road that will connect Nduga and Wamena. The trip of  Widodo and First Lady Iriana and his entourage from Wamena to Kenyam, Nduga Regency was taken for 2 hours by changing transportation modes from Hercules VVIP A 1314 and Heli Super Puma TNI AU. On that occasion President Jokowi also conveyed, in addition to building a road leading to Wamena, in the Nduga region Mumugu's large port will also be opened. With the opening of this large port, the logistics and materials from and to Mumugu can be distributed using land routes that have penetrated all districts in Papua.

Climate
Kenyam has a tropical rainforest climate (Af) with heavy rainfall year-round.

References 

Populated places in Highland Papua
Regency seats of Highland Papua